The House of Representatives of the National Assembly of the Republic of Belarus  is the lower house of the parliament of Belarus, while the upper house is the Council of the Republic. It was established after the Constitution of Belarus was amended in 1996, replacing the Supreme Council of Belarus.

It consists of 110 deputies elected to four year terms on the basis of direct electoral suffrage by secret ballot (art. 91). It is a majoritarian system, with the outcome decided by overall majorities in single-member constituencies. Any citizen of 21 years is eligible for election (art. 92). The functions of the House are to consider draft laws and the other business of government; it must approve the nomination of a prime minister (art. 97); and it may deliver a vote of no confidence on the government (art. 97).

Powers
Bills adopted by the House of Representatives are sent to the Council of the Republic for consideration within five days, where they are considered within no more than twenty days.

Special powers accorded only to the House of Representatives are:
consider draft laws put forward by the President or submitted by no less than 150 thousand eligible voters, to make amendments and alterations in the Constitution and give its interpretation;
consider draft laws, including the guidelines of the domestic and foreign policy of the Republic of Belarus; the military doctrine; ratification and denunciation of international treaties;
call elections for the Presidency;
grant consent to the President concerning the appointment of the Prime minister;
consider the report of the Prime minister on the policy of the Government and approve or reject it; a second rejection by the House of the policy of the Government is an expression of non-confidence to the Government.

Since constitutional amendments in 1996, the House of Representatives has little real power. Notably, the House has little control over government spending; it cannot pass a law to increase or decrease the budget without presidential consent. Additionally, if it rejects the president's nominee for prime minister two times, the president has the right to dissolve it. In practice, nearly all governing power is concentrated in the hands of President Alexander Lukashenko, and the House of Representatives does little more than approve the president's policies.

In the aftermath of the 2019 Belarusian parliamentary election, the Belarusian opposition lost all of its seats in the assembly, as every single elected deputy was deemed to support President Lukashenko. The House has been composed entirely of Lukashenko supporters for all but one term since 2004, and even before 2004 there had been little substantive opposition to presidential decisions.

Speakers of the House of Representatives

Fraction 
(2019, 7th convocation).

Members (since 1990)
List of Members of the Belarusian Parliament, 1990–95

See also
Parliament of Belarus
Council of the Republic of Belarus
Politics of Belarus
List of legislatures by country

Notes

References

External links
House of Representatives website

Government of Belarus
National Assembly of Belarus
Belarus
1997 establishments in Belarus